Cherkomasyev is a rural locality (a khutor) in Basakinskoye Rural Settlement, Chernyshkovsky District, Volgograd Oblast, Russia. The population was 68 as of 2010. There are 2 streets.

Geography 
Cherkomasyev is located on the left bank of the Rossosh River, 59 km southwest of Chernyshkovsky (the district's administrative centre) by road. Basakin is the nearest rural locality.

References 

Rural localities in Chernyshkovsky District